Heiskanen is a Finnish surname. Notable people with the surname include:

Juho Heiskanen (1889–1950), Finnish general
Kaarlo Heiskanen (1894–1962), Finnish general
Maria Heiskanen (born 1970), Finnish actress
Miro Heiskanen (born 1999), Finnish ice hockey player
Niko Heiskanen  (born 1989), Finnish footballer
Outi Heiskanen (1937–2022), Finnish artist
Santeri Heiskanen (born 1977), Finnish ice hockey player
Veikko Aleksanteri Heiskanen (1894–1971), Finnish geodesist

Finnish-language surnames